The National Parks and Access to the Countryside Act 1949 is an Act of the Parliament of the United Kingdom which created the National Parks Commission which later became the Countryside Commission and then the Countryside Agency, which became Natural England when it merged with English Nature in 2006.  The Act provided the framework for the creation of National Parks and Areas of Outstanding Natural Beauty in England and Wales, and also addressed public rights of way and access to open land. The Act was passed in 1949 with all-party support, as part of the reconstruction of the UK by the Labour government after World War II.

The Act followed reports by:
a Government committee chaired by Christopher Addison (later Viscount Addison) in 1931, 
John Dower, secretary of the Standing Committee on National Parks, to the Minister of Town and Country Planning in 1945, and
a Government committee chaired by Sir Arthur Hobhouse in 1947, which proposed 12 national parks.

The first 10 British national parks were designated as such in the 1950s under the Act in mostly poor-quality agricultural upland. An eleventh 'national park' in the Norfolk and Suffolk Broads was set up by a special Act of Parliament, the Norfolk and Suffolk Broads Act, in 1988. Strictly speaking, this is not a national park, but the differences are sufficiently small that this entity is always regarded as being "equivalent to" a national park. The New Forest was designated a national park on 1 March 2005. The South Downs, the last of the 12 areas chosen in the 1947 Hobhouse Report, was designated as South Downs National Park by the Secretary of State Hilary Benn in March 2009.

The structure set up by the National Parks and Access to the Countryside Act 1949 was amended by:
the Environmental Protection Act 1990, which created the Nature Conservancy Council (which later became Natural England and transferred functions of the Countryside Commission in Wales to the Countryside Council for Wales)
the Environment Act 1995, under which each national park is now operated by its own National Park Authority
the Countryside and Rights of Way Act 2000, under which AONBs are now designated
Further amendments are made by the Natural Environment and Rural Communities Act 2006, under which English Nature, the Countryside Agency and the Rural Development Service merged on 1 October 2006 to form new bodies called Natural England and the Commission for Rural Communities.

See also
National parks of the United Kingdom
National parks of England and Wales
Areas of Outstanding Natural Beauty in England and Wales

External links

National parks of England and Wales
United Kingdom Acts of Parliament 1949